Escape is the second album by avant-garde metal band Ram-Zet released on April 30, 2002 in the US by Spinefarm Records and Century Media Records. The band produced the album themselves. They recorded and engineered it at their personal studio in Norway, Space Valley Studios.

Track listing
 "R.I.P." - 8:54
 "Queen" - 7:03
 "The Claustrophobic Journey" - 7:54
 "Sound of Tranquillity - Peace" - 8:41
 "The Seeker" - 9:18
 "Pray" - 6:59
 "I'm Not Dead" - 6:38
 "The Moment She Died" - 8:08

Personnel
Ram-Zet
 Miriam Elisabeth "Sfinx" Renvåg - lead vocals
 Küth - drums
 Magnus Østvang - keyboards, stuff
 Henning "Zet" Ramseth - lead vocals, guitar, lyrics
 Solem - bass
 Ingvild "Sareeta" Johannesen - violin, backing vocals

Additional musicians
 Sissel Strømbu, Renate Grimsbø Kuldbrandstad, Randi Strømbu, Mari Bakke Ottinsen, Ane Thune Børresen - Choirs
 Mie Kristine Storbekken Lindstad - lyrics

Production
 Ram-Zet - arrangements, producing, engineering
 Space Valley Studios - recording studio
 Mikko Karmilla at Finnvox Studios - mixing
 Mika Jussila at Finnvox Studios - mastering

Artwork
 Torel Larsen - photography
 Aage Villy Skaaret - photography
 Yngve Sørli - cover model
 Sunniva Daae Andersen - cover model

References

2002 albums
Ram-Zet albums
Century Media Records albums
Spinefarm Records albums
Concept albums